Devotion is an unincorporated community in the Bryan Township of western Surry County, North Carolina, United States.  Devotion is situated on the Mitchell River, and is the site of a large family estate owned by members of the R. J. Reynolds family .

References
 

Unincorporated communities in Surry County, North Carolina
Unincorporated communities in North Carolina